The War (German: "Der Krieg"), sometimes known as the Dresden War Triptych, is a large oil painting by Otto Dix on four wooden panels, a triptych with predella.  The format of the work and its composition are based on religious triptychs of the Renaissance, like those by Matthias Grünewald. It was begun in 1929 and completed in 1932, and has been held by the Galerie Neue Meister in Dresden since 1968. It is one of several anti-war works done by Dix in the 1920s, inspired by his experience of trench warfare in the First World War.

Background
Dix was an art student in Dresden before the First World War. He was conscripted in 1915, and served in the Imperial German Army as a machine gunner on the Eastern and Western Fronts. He returned to study at the Dresden Academy of Fine Arts, and then in Italy.  After the war, he was a founder of the short-lived avant-garde Dresdner Sezession art group, and then supported the post-expressionist New Objectivity movement. The anti-war art that Dix created after 1920 was inspired by his horrific experiences in the trenches.  Before this triptych, he completed his large anti-war painting The Trench in 1923, which caused great controversy when first exhibited, and he published a portfolio of fifty prints also entitled Der Krieg in 1924.

Dix became a professor at the Dresden Academy in 1927. He started working on the triptych soon after the tenth anniversary of the end of the First World War, as a reaction to the popular public perception of the war as a heroic experience. The painting was first exhibited at the autumn exhibition of the Berlin Academy of Arts in 1932.

Many of Dix's works were condemned as degenerate art by the Nazi Party, but the triptych was hidden by Dix and survived. Several of Dix's preparatory cartoons are held by the Hamburger Kunsthalle. The War was bought by the Galerie Neue Meister in Dresden for 500,000 Deutsche Marks in 1968.

Description
The triptych has three main panels, with a fourth as a supporting panel or predella below the main central panel.

From left to right, the left wing depicts a column of German soldiers marching away from the viewer through the fog of war towards the battle in the central scene.  The central panel shows a devastated urban landscape scattered with war paraphernalia and body parts, reworking the themes in his 1923 work The Trench, and divided like the 16th century Isenheim Altarpiece of Matthias Grünewald with a living side to the lower left and a dead side to the upper right. A skeletal figure floats above the scene, pointing to the right, with a soldier in gas mask below, and scabrous legs upended to the right, recalling the legs of Christ in Grünewald's crucifixion scene. The right wing shows several figures withdrawing from the fight. A dominant greyish figure, helping a wounded comrade, is a self-portrait of Dix, in a composition similar to a descent from the cross or a pietà. In the predella, several soldiers are lying next to each other, possibly sleeping under an awning, or perhaps they represent the dead in a tomb. This fourth panel is based on The Body of the Dead Christ in the Tomb by Hans Holbein the Younger.

The painting uses a restricted palette of mainly dark colours, with cold greens, greys, and whites for death and decay, and warm reds and oranges for blood, destruction and shellfire.

See also
 Dresden Triptych

References
 The War, Otto Dix 1929–32, Google Arts & Culture
 Der Krieg (Triptychon), Staatliche Kunstsammlungen Dresden
 Otto Dix: Der Krieg - das Dresdner Triptychon
 OTTO DIX (1891-1969), Der Krieg engravings,. Christie's, 19 September 2017
 Tatar, Maria. "Fighting for Life: Figurations of War, Women, and the City in the Work of Otto Dix." German Politics & Society, no. 32 (1994): 28–57. https://www.jstor.org/stable/23736326.
 Unpacking a painting
 Otto Dix, Der Krieg: Mitteltafel - Karton zu dem Triptychon "Der Krieg", 1930

Paintings by Otto Dix
Staatliche Kunstsammlungen Dresden
1932 paintings
War paintings